Discovery Channel (often referred to as simply Discovery) is a Canadian specialty television channel owned by CTV Speciality Television Inc. (a joint venture between Bell Media/ESPN Inc. (80%) and Warner Bros. Discovery (which owns the remaining 20%).

Launched on January 1, 1995 by NetStar Communications, this channel is devoted to nature, adventure, science and technology programming. The channel is headquartered at 9 Channel Nine Court in the Agincourt neighbourhood of Scarborough in Toronto, Ontario.

History
Licensed by the Canadian Radio-television and Telecommunications Commission (CRTC) in 1994, Discovery Channel launched on January 1, 1995 under the ownership of NetStar Communications Inc.

On March 24, 2000, the CRTC approved a proposal by CTV Inc. to acquire voting interest in NetStar Communications Inc. CTV renamed the company CTV Speciality Television Inc.

A high definition simulcast feed of Discovery Channel that broadcasts in the 1080i resolution format was launched on August 15, 2003. The feed would later be shut down on December 19, 2005, and be replaced by a separate category 2 digital cable specialty channel called Discovery HD Theatre.

On June 17, 2011, Bell Media announced that it would launch, for a second time, an HD simulcast feed of Discovery Channel; this feed was launched on August 18, 2011.

In November 2015, Bell Media announced Discovery Channel Canada's first original scripted drama, the Jason Momoa-fronted Frontier, chronicling the North American fur trade. The series was picked up internationally by Netflix.

Programming
In addition to shows acquired from its American counterpart, the Canadian Discovery Channel produced much of its own original programming through its Exploration Production  group including its former flagship daily science news program, Daily Planet, and its own domestic version of Cash Cab. Several programs produced by the Canadian Discovery Channel (such as How It's Made) have also aired on the U.S. Science Channel.

Since 2018, enabled by the 2015 retirement of CRTC genre protection rules which mandated that it predominantly air factual programming, the channel has added reruns of scripted series from other Bell Media networks that contain scientific themes, such as The Big Bang Theory, Bones and CSI: NY.

Original series 

Against All Odds
Acorn the Nature Nut
Aerospace
Airshow
Alien Mysteries
Beastly Countdown
Beyond Invention
Birth of a Sports Car
Bitchin' Rides
Blood, Sweat & Tools
Blueprint for Disaster
BBQ Pit Wars
Breaking Point
Break It Down
Building the Biggest
Building the Ultimate (UK: Five coproduction)
Canadian Geographic Presents
Canada's Greatest Know-It-All
Canada's Worst Driver
Canada's Worst Handyman
Cold Water Cowboys
Cash Cab
Combat School
Connections
Creepy Canada
A Cut Above
Daily Planet (formerly @discovery.ca) (cancelled in 2018 as the result of Bell Media layoffs)
Dangerous Flights
Doctor*Ology
Don't Drive Here
Eco-Challenge
Exhibit A: Secrets of Forensic Science
Factory Made
Fat N' Furious: Rolling Thunder
Flightpath
Fool's Gold
Forensic Factor
Frontier
Frontiers of Construction
Great Canadian Parks
Guinea Pig
Highway Thru Hell
High Tech Rednecks
How Do They Do It? (UK Wag TV coproduction)
How It's Made
Insectia
I Shouldn't Be Alive
Jacked!
Jade Fever
Jetstream
Junk Raiders
Junk Raiders 2
Last Car Standing
Licence to Drill
Licence to Drill: Louisiana
Manufactured
Mayday
Mega Builders
MegaSpeed
Mega World
'Mean Machines (UK IWC Media coproduction)
Mean Green Machines
Mighty Planes
Mighty Ships
Mighty Trains
Naked Science (UK Pioneer Productions coproduction)
Nature of the Beast
Never Ever Do This At Home
On the Run
Out in the Cold
Patent Bending
Pyros
Qubit
Risk Takers
Rocket Science
Sci Q
Science To Go
Star Racer
Superships
The Body Machine
The Exodus Decoded
The Sex Files
The World's Strangest UFO Stories
Ultimate Cars (UK IWC Media coproduction)
Ultimate
Vegas Rat Rods
White Hot Winter
What's That About?
You Asked For It

See also
 Discovery Channel (US)
 Science Channel (US)

References

External links
 
 CRTC Homepage
 Exploration Production Inc. official website

Bell Media networks
Canada
Analog cable television networks in Canada
Companies based in Scarborough, Toronto
Television channels and stations established in 1995
English-language television stations in Canada
1995 establishments in Canada